Benjamin Treadwell Onderdonk (July 15, 1791, New York City – April 30, 1861, New York) was the Bishop of the Episcopal Diocese of New York from 1830–1861.

Early years
A member of a prominent Hempstead family, Onderdonk graduated from Columbia College, now Columbia University, where he was president of the Philolexian Society. He studied theology under Bishop John Henry Hobart and was a member of the Episcopal Theological Society between 1810 and 1811.
He married Elizabeth Handy Moscrop, daughter of Rev. Henry Moscrop and Elizabeth Handy.

He presided over the Diocese during a period of expansion and was instrumental in the creation of numerous parishes, but is best remembered as one of the most controversial figures in the history of the Episcopal Church of the United States. He served as the officiant at the wedding of President John Tyler and Julia Gardiner at the Church of the Ascension in 1844.

Consecrators
 William White, Bishop of Pennsylvania, Presiding Bishop of the ECUSA
 Thomas Church Brownell, Bishop of Connecticut
 Henry U. Onderdonk, Bishop of Pennsylvania, older brother of Benjamin Tredwell Onderdonk

The Carey Affair
A strong supporter of the Oxford Movement, Onderdonk became embroiled in a controversy surrounding the ordination of Arthur Carey. Carey, a candidate for the ministry acknowledged even by his detractors as being of superb intellect and dedication, and also of an excellent Christian character, was like Onderdonk greatly influenced by the Oxford Movement.

As his ordination approached, Carey was examined by the Rev. Dr. Hugh Smith, Rector of St. Peter's, New York (where he had been assigned). During this interview, Carey professed views that were sympathetic to Roman Catholicism, and thereafter Smith and some other clergy and laymen opposed Carey's ordination. At Smith's insistence, Onderdonk conducted an inquiry, which ultimately found Carey to be suitable for ordination, which was celebrated in 1843. The dispute did not end there, and a number of letters were published accusing Carey and ultimately Onderdonk of being overly sympathetic to Roman Catholicism. This controversy spread beyond the Diocese, and at least one other Diocese, that of Ohio, adopted a resolution condemning Onderdonk.

Allegations of misconduct
As the Carey controversy was ongoing, William Meade, Bishop of Virginia (later the Presiding Bishop of the Episcopal Church in the Confederate States of America) received a number of affidavits of women who alleged that Onderdonk had made improper advances towards them and had engaged in improper touching. This eventually resulted in a trial before the House of Bishops. Throughout, Onderdonk maintained his innocence.  By all accounts the trial was a bitter affair, with Onderdonk making accusations of a secret conspiracy to remove him due to his theological views by falsifying charges and Meade accusing the Onderdonk faction of witness intimidation. The trial resulted in the suspension of Onderdonk.

Whether the trial was an appropriate act to punish a Bishop for improper behavior or a conspiracy to silence a proponent of the Oxford Movement may be ultimately unknowable. The debate continued in published letters throughout Onderdonk's life and indeed continues today. What is clear though, as William Manross notes in A History of the American Episcopal Church (1935), was that the verdict against Onderdonk reflects "the bitter party feeling which prevailed at the time, especially as the voting throughout the trial was pretty much along party lines, all of the evangelicals voting to condemn Bishop Onderdonk and most, though not all, of the High Churchmen voting to acquit him."

Following his suspension, Onderdonk remained Bishop of the Episcopal Diocese of New York but was suspended from performing his duties. Provisional Bishops were consecrated to fill his duties. They were Jonathan Mayhew Wainwright I, consecrated to serve as Provisional Bishop in place of Bishop Onderdonk, 1852–1854 and Horatio Potter consecrated in 1854 to serve as Provisional Bishop in place of Onderdonk; became diocesan in 1861. His brother, Henry Ustick Onderdonk, Bishop of Pennsylvania, was also suspended upon allegations of intemperance during the same time period.

Death
Benjamin Treadwell Onderdonk died at age 69 in 1861. His sarcophagus, now ensconced at Trinity Church in New York City, depicts him lying in repose yet crushing a serpent labeled "Scandal" beneath his heel.

Bibliography
 Online documents connected with B.T. Onderdonk
 Charles Wells Hayes, The Diocese of Western New York: History and Recollections, 2nd ed., vol. I, p. 174.
 Cohen, Patricia Cline. "Ministerial Misdeeds: The Onderdonk Trial and Sexual Harassment in the 1840s." (1996)
 Juster, Susan & MacFarlane, Lisa. (Eds.). A Mighty Baptism: Race, Gender, and the Creation of American Protestantism. Ithaca, NY: Cornell University Press, (1995)
 William Manross, A History of the American Episcopal Church (1935)

References

1791 births
1861 deaths
Episcopal bishops of New York
American people of Dutch descent
Columbia College (New York) alumni
People from Hempstead (village), New York
19th-century Anglican bishops in the United States
General Theological Seminary faculty
18th-century Anglican theologians
19th-century Anglican theologians